Liv is a Nordic female given name derived from the Old Norse "hlíf", which means "shelter" or "protection". In modern Norwegian, Swedish, and Danish it is also homophonous with the word "liv" meaning "life".

In Norse mythology, Líf and Lífþrasir (Old Norse masculine name from líf and þrasir), were two humans foretold to survive Ragnarök and to repopulate the world.

Sometimes Liv can be a shortened version of Olivia.

Given name
 Liv Aasen (1928–2005), Norwegian politician for the Labour Party
 Liv Andersen (1919–1997), Norwegian politician for the Labour Party
 Liv Arnesen (born 1953), Norwegian cross-country skier, adventurer, guide, and motivational speaker
 Liv Kjersti Bergman (born 1979), Norwegian biathlete
 Liv Boeree (born 1984), British poker player, TV presenter, and model
 Liv Dawson, British pop singer
 Liv Dommersnes (1922–2014), Norwegian actress and reciter of poetry
 Liv Kristine Espenæs (born 1976), Norwegian singer, former vocalist of the bands Theatre of Tragedy and Leaves' Eyes
 Liv Gjølstad (born 1945), Norwegian judge
 Liv Grete Skjelbreid Poirée (born 1974), Norwegian biathlete
 Liv Heløe (born 1963), Norwegian actress and writer
 Liv Jensen, Norwegian luger who competed in the late 1930s
 Liv Køltzow (born 1945), Norwegian novelist, playwright, biographer and essayist
 Liv Løberg (born 1949), Norwegian practical nurse, organization leader and politician for the Progress Party
 Liv Lindeland (born 1945), Norwegian model and actress
 Liv Maessen, Australian pop singer
 Liv Mildrid Gjernes (born 1954), Norwegian artist
 Liv Monica Stubholt (born 1961), politician, investment director for Aker Clean Carbon
 Liv Morgan (born 1994), American professional wrestler
 Liv Nysted (1949–2010), Norwegian writer
 Liv Paulsen (1925–2001), Norwegian 100 metres sprinter and shot putter
 Liv Sandven (born 1946), Norwegian politician from the Christian Democratic Party
 Liv Signe Navarsete (born 1958), Norwegian politician
 Liv Strædet (born 1964), Norwegian football player 
 Liv Stubberud (1930–1997), Norwegian politician 
 Liv Thorsen (1935–2021), Norwegian actress
 Liv Tomter (1901–1978), Norwegian politician for the Labour Party
 Liv Tyler (born 1977), American actress and model
 Liv Ullmann (born 1938), Norwegian actress and film director
 Liv Lisa Fries (born 1990), German actress

Fictional characters
 Liv Chenka, character of the BBC science-fiction series Doctor Who
 Liv Flaherty, character from the British soap opera Emmerdale
 Liv Moore, main character on the TV series iZombie
 Liv Rooney, one of the main characters of the Disney Channel sitcom Liv and Maddie
 Liv, character played by Kate Hudson in Bride Wars film 

Norwegian feminine given names